The Otorehinaiti River is a river of the northwestern Hawke's Bay region of New Zealand's North Island. It flows northwest from the Kaweka Forest Park to reach the Mohaka River.

See also
List of rivers of New Zealand

References

Rivers of the Hawke's Bay Region
Rivers of New Zealand